This is the discography for American jazz musician Eddie Costa.

As leader

As sideman 
Costa played piano, vibes, or both on the albums listed in the table below. Other recordings, where his presence is disputed or the music is classical, are not listed.

Sources:

References 

Discographies of American artists
Jazz discographies